Grunts! (1992) is a satiric fantasy novel by British writer Mary Gentle. It is set in a basic fantasy world taken from the usual The Lord of the Rings mould, with orcs and elves using magic and typical medieval weaponry, but it plays heavily on black comedy and strong doses of violence and graphic description, frequently depicting scenes "over the top."

Plot summary
The story follows a group of orcs who always find themselves on the front lines of battle against the carefully prepared and always triumphant forces of good. The orcs decided to organize themselves and fight back. As a satire of high fantasy the novel mocks most of the conventions of the genre from using traditional villainous races, orcs, as the protagonists, to having the noble characters have much less than noble motivations and secrets.

The opening of the book plays up the  orc warleader sent to reclaim a weapons cache in preparation for the 'Last Battle' between good and evil, which is well on its way. They are assisted by a pair of halflings whose cute demeanor is contrasted with extremely violent acts.

The orcs uncover a dragon's hoard of modern military weaponry, which is endowed with a geas that transforms their minds into replicas of the stereotypical United States Marine Corps mindset, during the Vietnam War. Gentle continues the storyline through the Last Battle and the orcs' integration into society, along with a military threat that rivals the orcs themselves.

External links
 

1992 British novels
British fantasy novels
Works about the United States Marine Corps
Orcs in popular culture
Bantam Press books